Paraligusticum is a genus of flowering plants belonging to the family Apiaceae. It has only one species, Paraligusticum discolor. Its native range is Central Asia to Mongolia.

References

Apioideae
Monotypic Apioideae genera